al-Malikiyah is a village in northern Aleppo Governorate, northwestern Syria.

The village administratively belongs to Nahiya Azaz in Azaz District. Nearby localities include Maraanaz  to the east, on the western edge of the Queiq Plain, and Maryamin  further to the west. In the 2004 census, al-Malikiyah had a population of 177.

References

Populated places in Azaz District
Villages in Aleppo Governorate